The Agrarian League (LA) was a political party in Romania.

History
A breakaway from the People's Party, the LA contested the 1931 elections as part of the National Union alliance. The alliance won 274 seats, of which the LA took four.

It ran alone in the 1932 elections, but received just 0.5% of the vote and failed to win a seat.

Electoral history

Legislative elections

References

Agrarian parties in Romania
Defunct political parties in Romania